Brewster Gardens (or the Elder Brewster Gardens) is a park located in the center of Plymouth, Massachusetts. The park runs along both sides of Town Brook from the nature trail at the headwaters of the brook, past Jenney Grist Mill, underneath the Market Street and Main Street Extension (Route 3A) bridges to Water Street, across the street from the mouth of the brook, south of Plymouth Rock. Created in the early 1920s, the park covers the original garden plot that was granted to Elder William Brewster in 1620. Located in the park are a bronze statue, The Pilgrim Maiden by Henry Hudson Kitson (1922) and a stainless steel sculpture honoring Plymouth's immigrant settlers from 1700 to 2000.

External links 
Town of Plymouth Parks, Playgrounds and Beaches

Plymouth, Massachusetts